This is a list of the longest rivers in New Zealand, and some other prominent rivers, ordered by length.

South Island rivers are marked "SI", and North Island rivers "NI".

The 20 longest rivers

Other prominent rivers

Over 100 kilometres
Ngaruroro (NI) - 154 km (96 mi)
Motu River (NI) - 147 km (91 mi)
Rakaia River (SI) - 145 km (90 mi)
Pātea River (NI) - 143 km (89 mi)
Hurunui River (SI) - 138 km (86 mi)
Turakina River (NI) - 137 km (85 mi)
Wairoa River, Bay of Plenty (NI) - 137 km (85 mi)
Wairoa River (Northland) (NI) - 132 km (82 mi)
Awatere River (SI) - 126 km (78 mi)
Ruamahanga River (NI) - 124 km (77 mi)
Grey River or Mawhera River (SI) - 121 km (75 mi)
Rangitata River (SI) - 120 km (74 mi)
Tuki Tuki River (NI) - 119 km (74 mi)
Motueka River (SI) - 116 km (72 mi)
Waitaki River (SI) - 111 km (69 mi)
Aparima River (SI) - 102 km (63 mi)

50 to 100 kilometres
Tutaekuri River (NI) - 100 km (62 mi)
Whakatane River (NI) - 95 km (59 mi)
Pomahaka River (SI) - 81 km (50 mi)
Waipaoa River (NI) 80 km (50 mi)
Selwyn River (SI) 80 km (50 mi)
Taramakau River (SI) 75 km (46 mi)
Opihi River (SI) - 75 km (46 mi)
Orari River (SI) - 74 km (46 mi)
Karamea River (SI) - 73 km (45 mi)
Ongarue River (NI) - 73 km (45 mi)
Ahuriri River (SI) - 70 km (43 mi)
Inangahua River (SI) - 65 km (40 mi)
Moawhango River (NI) - 62 km (38 mi)
Waitoa River (NI) - 62 km (38 mi)
Shotover River (SI) - 60 km (37 mi)
Hutt River (NI) - 56 km (35 mi)
Ruakituri River (NI) - 55 km (34 mi)
Manganui River, Northland (NI) - 53 km (33 mi)
Whenuakura River (NI) -53 km (33 mi)
Eglinton River (SI) - 51 km (32 mi)
Kaituna River (NI) - 50 km (31 mi) (approx)

Under 50 kilometres
Waingawa River, (Wairarapa), a tributary of the Ruamahanga River - 48 km (13 mi)
Tauherenikau River, (Wairarapa), draining into Lake Wairarapa - 41 km (13 mi)
Waiohine River, (Wairarapa), a tributary of the Ruamahanga River - 35 km (13 mi)
Freshwater River (Stewart Island) - 25 km (15 mi) (longest New Zealand river not in the North or South Island)
Waiwawa River - 21 km (13 mi) (longest river on the Coromandel Peninsula)
Waimata River (NI) - 20 km (16 mi)
Makara River (Chatham Island) - 16 km (10 mi) (longest New Zealand river not in New Zealand's main island chain)
Avon River / Ōtākaro (SI) - 15 km (9.5 mi)
Water of Leith (SI) - 14 km (9 mi)

Shortest rivers 
 Awaroa River (Far North) (Northland) – 12 km (7.5 mi)
 Awaroa River (Waikato River tributary) – 12 km (7.5 mi)
 Tawatahi River (Waikato) – 2 km (1.2 mi)
 Turanganui River (Gisborne) – 0.9 km (0.56 mi)

See also
List of rivers of New Zealand
List of rivers
List of rivers of Oceania
List of islands of New Zealand#In rivers and lakes
List of lakes in New Zealand

References
The Air New Zealand Almanac 1989. Wellington: New Zealand Press Association.

External links

 

Length
Length
Rivers